The Thirteenth Canadian Ministry was the second cabinet chaired by Prime Minister Arthur Meighen.  It governed Canada from 29 June 1926 to 25 September 1926, including only the last three months of the 15th Canadian Parliament, all cabinet ministers were acting cabinet ministers as Meighen hadn't been given the confidence of the house, and any cabinet ministers appointed by him would have had to resign their seats and run for re-election.  The government was formed by the old Conservative Party of Canada.  Meighen was also Prime Minister in the Eleventh Canadian Ministry.

Ministers
Prime Minister
29 June 1926 – 25 September 1926: Arthur Meighen
Minister of Agriculture
29 June 1926 – 13 July 1926: Henry Herbert Stevens (acting)
13 July 1926 – 25 September 1926: Simon Fraser Tolmie
Minister of Customs and Excise
29 June 1926 – 13 July 1926: Henry Herbert Stevens (acting)
13 July 1926 – 25 September 1926: Henry Herbert Stevens
Secretary of State for External Affairs
29 June 1926 – 25 September 1926: Arthur Meighen
Minister of Finance
29 June 1926 – 13 July 1926: Sir Henry Lumley Drayton (acting)
13 July 1926 – 25 September 1926: R. B. Bennett
Receiver General of Canada
29 June 1926 – 25 September 1926: The Minister of Finance (Ex officio)
29 June 1926 – 13 July 1926: Sir Henry Lumley Drayton (acting)
13 July 1926 – 25 September 1926: R. B. Bennett
Minister presiding over the Department of Health
29 June 1926 – 13 July 1926: Robert James Manion (acting)
13 July 1926 – 23 August 1926: Raymond Ducharme Morand (acting)
23 August 1926 – 25 September 1926: Eugène Paquet
Minister of Immigration and Colonization
29 June 1926 – 13 July 1926: Robert James Manion (acting)
13 July 1926 – 25 September 1926: Sir Henry Lumley Drayton
Superintendent-General of Indian Affairs
29 June 1926 – 25 September 1926: The Minister of the Interior (Ex officio)
29 June 1926 – 13 July 1926: Henry Herbert Stevens (acting)
13 July 1926 – 25 September 1926: R. B. Bennett (acting)
Minister of the Interior
29 June 1926 – 13 July 1926: Henry Herbert Stevens (acting)
13 July 1926 – 25 September 1926: R. B. Bennett (acting)
Minister of Justice 
29 June 1926 – 13 July 1926: Hugh Guthrie (acting)
13 July 1926 – 25 September 1926: Esioff-Léon Patenaude
Attorney General of Canada
29 June 1926 – 25 September 1926: The Minister of Justice (Ex officio)
29 June 1926 – 13 July 1926: Hugh Guthrie (acting)
13 July 1926 – 25 September 1926: Esioff-Léon Patenaude
Minister of Labour
29 June 1926 – 13 July 1926: Robert James Manion (acting)
13 July 1926 – 25 September 1926: George Burpee Jones
Minister of Marine and Fisheries
29 June 1926 – 13 July 1926: William Anderson Black (acting)
13 July 1926 – 25 September 1926: Esioff-Léon Patenaude
Minister of Mines
29 June 1926 – 13 July 1926: Henry Herbert Stevens (acting)
13 July 1926 – 25 September 1926: R. B. Bennett (acting)
Minister of National Defence
29 June 1926 – 13 July 1926: Hugh Guthrie (acting)
13 July 1926 – 25 September 1926: Hugh Guthrie
Postmaster General
29 June 1926 – 13 July 1926: Robert James Manion (acting)
13 July 1926 – 25 September 1926: Robert James Manion
President of the Privy Council
29 June 1926 – 25 September 1926: Arthur Meighen
Minister of Public Works
29 June 1926 – 13 July 1926: Sir George Halsey Perley (acting)
13 July 1926 – 25 September 1926: Edmond Baird Ryckman
Minister of Railways and Canals 
29 June 1926 – 13 July 1926: Sir Henry Lumley Drayton (acting)
13 July 1926 – 25 September 1926: William Anderson Black
Secretary of State of Canada
29 June 1926 – 13 July 1926: George Halsey Perley (acting)
13 July 1926 – 25 September 1926: Sir George Halsey Perley
Registrar General of Canada
29 June 1926 – 25 September 1926: The Secretary of State of Canada (Ex officio)
29 June 1926 – 13 July 1926: Sir George Halsey Perley (acting)
13 July 1926 – 25 September 1926: George Halsey Perley
Minister of Soldiers' Civil Re-establishment
29 June 1926 – 13 July 1926: Robert James Manion (acting)
13 July 1926 – 23 August 1926: Raymond Ducharme Morand (acting)
23 August 1926 – 25 September 1926: Eugène Paquet
Solicitor General of Canada
29 June 1926 – 23 August 1926: Vacant
23 August 1926 – 25 September 1926: Guillaume-André Fauteux
Minister of Trade and Commerce
29 June 1926 – 13 July 1926: Henry Herbert Stevens (acting)
13 July 1926 – 25 September 1926: James Dew Chaplin
Minister without Portfolio 
7 July 1926 – 13 July 1926: R. B. Bennett
13 July 1926 – 25 September 1926: Sir Henry Lumley Drayton
13 July 1926 – 25 September 1926: Raymond Ducharme Morand
13 July 1926 – 25 September 1926: John Alexander Macdonald
13 July 1926 – 25 September 1926: Donald Sutherland

Offices not of the Cabinet
Leader of the Government in the Senate
29 June 1926 – 25 September 1926: William Benjamin Ross
Parliamentary Secretary of Soldiers' Civil Re-establishment
29 June 1926 – 25 September 1926: Vacant

References

Succession

13
1926 establishments in Canada
1926 disestablishments in Canada
Cabinets established in 1926
Cabinets disestablished in 1926
Ministries of George V